Pyranose dehydrogenase (acceptor) (pyranose dehydrogenase, pyranose-quinone oxidoreductase, quinone-dependent pyranose dehydrogenase, PDH) is an enzyme with systematic name pyranose:acceptor oxidoreductase. This enzyme catalyses the following chemical reaction

 (1) a pyranose + acceptor  a pyranos-2-ulose (or a pyranos-3-ulose or a pyranos-2,3-diulose) + reduced acceptor
 (2) a pyranoside + acceptor  a pyranosid-3-ulose (or a pyranosid-3,4-diulose) + reduced acceptor

This enzyme requires FAD. A number of aldoses and ketoses in pyranose form, as well as glycosides, gluco-oligosaccharides, sucrose and lactose can act as a donor.

References

External links 
 

EC 1.1.99